The 1969–70 Cypriot First Division was the 31st season of the Cypriot top-level football league.

Overview
It was contested by 12 teams, and EPA Larnaca FC won the championship.  Olympiakos Nicosia participated in the Greek championship as the previous year's champions. They finished in 17th position.

League standings

Results

References
Cyprus - List of final tables (RSSSF)

Cypriot First Division seasons
Cypriot First Division, 1969-70
1